City Gardens was a nightclub located at 1701 Calhoun Street in Trenton, New Jersey. It opened in 1979 and closed in 2001.

History

Early years
The Nalbone family of Trenton and Lawrence, New Jersey, owned the building several years before it became a legendary rock club. The "City Gardens" moniker was first used strictly as a blues club in early 1978. Before its life as a blues club, it was an afterhours club called Chocolate City (after the 1975 Parliament-Funkadelic song of the same name) circa 1976-1978. (Coincidentally, that same band would perform at City Gardens with P-Funk leader George Clinton nearly two decades later.) Kurtis Blow had performed at Chocolate City before his release "The Breaks", which is recognized as the first rap song to be certified as a gold record. The building had also been written up in local newspaper accounts as a Bible warehouse, and also known for many years in the 1960s as a car dealership called US 1 Motors.

90 Cent Dance Night
The popular 90 Cent Dance Night, on Thursdays, began with DJ Randy Now (Randy Ellis) in 1979 featured music not only from the late 70's UK & USA Punk scene but Randy Now incorporating the newest emerging "new wave" music scene along with ska and reggae music; interspersed with an occasional 60's garage rock classic. 90 Cent Dance Nights went to 95 cents in 1983 and was taken over by DJ Carlos (Carlos Santos) in early 1983. DJ Carlos was the main Thursday night and house DJ until late 1994, playing a combination of new wave, alternative, industrial rock and cutting-edge dance music for the time period. At the height of its popularity, which started in 1979 and until the mid to late 1990s, the "90 Cent Dance Night" party regularly drew 700-1000 people weekly and often broke over 1,000 customers on the door count during the holiday seasons.  By 1992, the admission price was raised 4% and renamed "99 Cent Dance Night".  Randy Now tells the story where he remembers Greg Hetson (Bad Religion / The Circle Jerks) visiting him in NJ and Randy bringing Greg to a Thursday Night Dance Party.  Randy was the DJ that evening. Greg at first didn't believe 1000 people would come out to hear and dance to a DJ. At the end of the evening, Hetson is quoted as saying "Brilliant idea of having a 90 cent dance night cover charge; someone in Los Angeles like Gary Tovar should get on board."

Aftermath
Randy Now was let go from City Gardens in 1996 and the club closed in 2001. DJ Rich O'Brien was the last regular club DJ employed by City Gardens.

In 2003 photographer Marty Munsch, a long time City Gardens Patron, began documenting the chronological, yearly internal and external demise of the location fully until it is fully a vacant lot. For photo historical reference and publishing at a future date.

In April 2013, Lawrence Campbell of Exodus Entertainment LLC purchased the building with hopes of turning the site into both a community center and a hall for private functions.

In April 2016, the city of Trenton took possession of the property. In August 2019, it was reported that Trenton would be auctioning off 89 city-owned properties in September 2019, in an effort to encourage the development of vacant properties to be used for future homes and businesses. Among the properties listed was the lot City Gardens sits on.

Notable bookings and staff
A Flock of Seagulls, Thompson Twins and Sinéad O'Connor all made their American debuts at City Gardens. Danzig performed their first show ever at the venue. The venue also hosted a performance by comedian Henny Youngman and speaking engagements by counter-culture personalities Timothy Leary. Jon Stewart, famed for his work with MTV and Comedy Central's The Daily Show, was a bartender at City Gardens from 1984-1987, before his stand-up comedy career and later television career took off. Stewart never performed at City Gardens, and there is only one known photo that exists of him inside the club. James Murphy, leader of LCD Soundsystem, was an underage bouncer for City Gardens during the hardcore Sunday matinee shows in the 1980s.

Ween called City Gardens their home base. Their first "club" show was opening for the Butthole Surfers as teenagers, and one of their early live shows at City Gardens was released on the live album The Live Brain Wedgie/WAD. The Ramones performed at City Gardens 25 times, including one of only two performances by the band to feature drummer Clem Burke of Blondie (billed as "Elvis Ramone"). R.E.M.'s Peter Buck was quoted, in the Tony Fletcher book Remarks, as saying that sitting in the band's van outside of City Gardens watching children play football was part of the feeling that inspired their song "Perfect Circle".

Over 4,000 bands performed at City Gardens, with Randy "Now" Ellis booking probably 98% of the artists who performed at the club. Tim Hinely notes in a 2004 issue of Go Metric! "every punk band who is a punk band played there," naming his favorite performances as The Descendents, Circle Jerks, Agnostic Front, Murphys Law, Butthole Surfers, Sonic Youth,  Mod Fun, Gwar and Ween, among others.

Book and film
In 2014, authors Amy Yates Wuelfing and Steven DiLodovico published a book on the City Gardens scene, No Slam Dancing, No Stage Diving, No Spikes: An Oral History of New Jersey's Legendary City Gardens. First and second editions, as well as hard cover book copies of the 464 page book, have sold at upwards of $150 on Ebay.

That same year, director Steve Tozzi released his documentary, Riot on the Dance Floor, based on Randy Now and City Gardens. The two-disc DVD of the movie went out-of-print after the initial 1200 copies sold out. On December 15, 2017, a limited run of 100 Blu-Ray copies of the film was released by director Steve Tozzi. This edition included additional footage and interviews not found on the original DVD release.

References

External links 
 City Gardens Facebook group
 Riot on the Dance Floor: The Story of Randy Now and City Gardens film
 No Slam Dancing, No Stage Diving, No Spikes: An Oral History of New Jersey's Legendary City Gardens book
 WFMU City Gardens blog
 CGs Calendar - DiWulf Publishing

Music venues in New Jersey